Tanumafili Malietoa Jungblut (born 10 June 1990) is an American Samoan Olympic weightlifter. He qualified for the 2016 Summer Olympics and was the American Samoan flag bearer during the opening ceremony. He won the bronze medal in the snatch at the 2016 Oceania Weightlifting Championships.

Results

References

External links

1990 births
Living people
American people of Samoan descent
American Samoan male weightlifters
Weightlifters at the 2016 Summer Olympics
Olympic weightlifters of American Samoa
Weightlifters at the 2020 Summer Olympics